This is a list of awards and nominations of Govinda, an Indian actor.

Govinda (born Govind Arun Ahuja on 21 December 1963) is an Indian actor and a former politician. Govinda has received twelve Filmfare Awards nominations winning three Filmfare Awards.

Making his debut in Ilzaam in 1986, he has appeared in over 140 Hindi films of the Bollywood industry. In June 1999, Govinda was voted as the tenth greatest star of stage or screen of the last thousand years by BBC News Online users. He has received many awards for his performance in Bollywood movies in his career spanning nearly three decades.

Filmfare Awards

Star Screen Awards

Zee Cine Awards

Videocon Screen Awards

IIFA Awards

Star Gold Awards

MTV Lycra Style Awards

Apsara Film & Television Producers Guild Awards

Stardust Awards

Hiru Golden Film Awards

Honours

In 1999, Govinda was voted the world's tenth-greatest star of stage or screen in a BBC News Online poll. In July 2016, he was recognized as Actor of the Decade at the India Leadership Conclave in Mumbai.

References

Lists of awards received by Indian actor